Jairo , pseudonym of Mario Rubén González Pierotti (born June 16, 1949) is an Argentine singer-songwriter and composer. Throughout his career, he has performed more than 500 songs in Spanish, French and Italian.

Among its most widespread songs they are: «Tu alma golondrina», «Por si tú quieres saber», «Tristezas», «De pronto sucedió», «El valle y el volcán», «Si vuelves será cansancio», «Amigos míos me enamoré», «Hoy dejó la ciudad», «Nos verán llegar», «Revólver» and «Me encanta esta hora del día».

Biography 
Mario Rubén González Pierotti was born in Cruz del Eje, on June 16, 1949. His beginnings as a singer were at school, where the band "The Twisters Boys" joined and finally adopted the name Marito González in game shows media hometown.

In 1970, together with a friend from high school, he distributed a twelve demo songs to different music producers; thus it managed to record a single disc with two songs. The artist Luis Aguilé sent him a job offer, signing a distribution agreement with CBS and moving to Spain.

In 1971 he won first Premio de la Crítica Española and second prize in the Festival of the Costa del Sol. That same year he was hired by the Ariola label. With the establishment of the National Reorganization Process in power, he chose to go into exile in Spain and later in France.

He recorded with Astor Piazzolla in 1981 several songs composed especially for him by Piazzolla himself and the Uruguayan poet Horacio Ferrer, among which stands out «Milonga del trovador» and «Hay una niña en el alba».

Towards the end of the military dictatorship, he returned to Argentina and gave a recital on the Avenida 9 de Julio, where he played to 1.2 million people their version of  «We Shall Overcome».

Throughout his career, he shared scenarios both their country and hospitalization stages with artists such as: Ana Belén, Ariel Ramírez, Eladia Blázquez, Graciela Borges, Jaime Torres, Juan Carlos Baglietto, La Mona Jiménez, Lito Vitale, Mercedes Sosa, Pedro Aznar, Piero and Víctor Heredia.

Discography 
 1965: Muy juvenil
 1970: Emociones
 1971: Por si tu quieres saber
 1973: Si vuelves, será cansancio
 1974: El valle y el volcán
 1975: Amigos míos, me enamoré
 1975: Jairo canta a Borges
 1976: De qué me sirve todo eso
 1977: Liberté es la nostalgia
 1977: Guitarra

 1978: Les plus beaux noel du monde
 1979: Viva el sol
 1979: Chansons a regarder
 1980: Symphonie
 1980: Jairo
 1981: Jairo a L’Olimpia
 1981: Morir enamorado
 1981: Viviré libre
 1981: Jairo internacional
 1981: Mis mejores canciones
 1982: L’amour au present
 1982: Todo Jairo
 1982: Jairo en italiano
 1982: Este amor es como el viento
 1983: Serie Oro: Jairo
 1984: Amor de cada día
 1984: Le diable
 1985: Jairo
 1986: La trace de mes pas
 1987: Intimidad (varios artistas), canción: «Para verte feliz»
 1987: Nicaragua
 1988: Jairo au bataclán
 1988: Más allá
 1990: Flechas de neón
 1990: Revólver
 1992: Jairo, les plus grands succes
 1994: Cielos
 1995: Jairo, 25 años. Volumen I
 1996: Argentina mía
 1996: Jairo, 25 años. Volumen II
 1997: Atahualpa por Jairo
 1997: Estampitas
 1998: Borges & Piazzolla
 1999: La balacera
 2000: Diario del regreso
 2001: 24 canciones de oro
 2001: Puro Jairo
 2003: Jairo canta a Piazzolla
 2003: Soy Libre DVD
 2004: El ferroviario
 2007: Criollo
 2009: Los enamorados
 2011: Concierto en Costa Rica (CD + DVD)
 2014: Propio y Ajeno

References

External links 

1949 births
Musicians from Córdoba, Argentina
Argentine expatriates in France
20th-century Argentine male singers
Argentine male singer-songwriters
Spanish-language singers
French-language singers
Living people